The Hilton Garden Inn Kampala, part of the Hilton Garden Inn chain, is a hotel in Kampala, the capital and largest city of Uganda. The building, under development since 2018, was commissioned in May 2019.

Location
The hotel is located in the Kawempe Division of the city of Kampala on Mulago Hill. The building stands along Old Kira Road, opposite the British High Commission. The geographical coordinates of the hotel are 00°20'16.0"N, 32°35'02.0"E (Latitude:0.337778; Longitude:32.583889).

Overview
This hotel is a purposely-built new construction with 96 rooms. The hotel was built and will be managed by the Alibhai Family, with a commissioning date in the second quarter of 2019. The hotel was commissioned by the Ugandan Tourism minister Ephraim Kamuntu, in May 2019.

Other developments
The international hotel chain, Hilton Hotels, having made failed attempts in the past, is expected to enter Uganda with two branded hotels, (a) the 244-room Kampala Hilton Hotel in the Nakasero neighborhood and (b) this hotel with a planned room count of 96 rooms. The 250-room The Pearl of Africa Hotel Kampala began as a planned Hilton-branded establishments, but disagreements halted the partnership.

See also
 Kampala Capital City Authority
 Kampala Serena Hotel
 List of tallest buildings in Kampala

References

External links
 Website of Hilton Garden Inn Kampala
 Hilton Expands Portfolio With First Property Opening In Ugandan Capital As of 26 June 2019.
 Hilton opens its First Hotel in Uganda: Hilton Garden Inn Kampala As of 22 April 2019.

Hotels in Kampala
Kampala Central Division
Buildings and structures in Kampala
Hotel buildings completed in 2019
2019 establishments in Uganda